The Giro d'Italia is one of cycling's three Grand Tours. A stage race that generally lasts for three weeks, it awards a number of jerseys for winners of certain classifications – the current competitions that award a jersey are:
General classification, for the fastest rider to complete the race. The winner wears the maglia rosa (pink jersey).
Points classification, for the rider with the most points as awarded by finishing positions on stages and the first riders to go through intermediate sprints. Recently, the winner wears the maglia rosso passione (red jersey).  In 2017, the race organizers brought back the maglia ciclamino (cyclamen jersey).
Mountains classification, for the rider awarded the most points for crossing designated climbs, generally at the peaks of hills and mountains. The winner wears the maglia azzurra (blue jersey).
Young rider classification, for the fastest rider under the age of 25 to complete the race. The winner wears the maglia bianca (white jersey).

General performances

Multiple winners

Winners by country

References

 
Giro d'Italia
Giro d'Italia